Atriplex leptocarpa, the slender-fruit saltbush, is a species of flowering plant in the family Amaranthaceae, native to Australia (except the Northern Territory and Tasmania), and introduced to Eritrea. It is typically found growing near rivers, lakes, and other periodically flooded areas.

References

leptocarpa
Endemic flora of Australia
Taxa named by Ferdinand von Mueller
Plants described in 1858